Kusatsu Station (草津駅) is the name of two train stations in Japan:

 Kusatsu Station (Hiroshima)
 Kusatsu Station (Shiga)